Wong Wei Long (born 18 August 1988 in Singapore) is a Chinese Singaporean professional basketball player. With his ability to knockdown the three ball at a high percentage, he has earned the nicknames of the Long-ranger and the Singapore Assassin.

ABL career 
In 2008, Wei Long had a brief stint with the Singapore Slingers while the team was competing in the 2008/09 Singapore Challenge Series.

On August 2009, Wei Long signed a one-year contract to play for the Singapore Slingers along with 7 other local players.  He scored a season high of 14 points, including 4 3-pointers against the Brunei Barracudas on 18 October 2009, the opening night of the inaugural ASEAN Basketball League.

On 29 November 2011, Wei Long, together with Shengyu Lim and Desmond Oh, formed the first trio of Singaporeans that signed new contracts with the Slingers for the 2012 Asean Basketball League season.

For the 2013 season, pursuing a higher education at Nanyang Technological University, Wei Long signed a new contract with the Slingers with a partial commitment, which sees him missing out on most of the teams' away games. Wei Long switched his No 5 jersey to 8. Despite juggling his commitments between his studies and the team, 2013 became Wei Long's most outstanding season yet. He was nominated for the AirAsia player of the month for February, averaging 16.5 points in that month. He was also honoured as one of the three best homegrown talents in the ASEAN region who averaged more than 10 points for their team.

On 31 March, Wei Long scored his career-high of 29 points against the Saigon Heat, the most points ever scored by any local player in the team. This performance topped his previous career-high of 20 points against the same team on 17 February 2013, the Singapore Slingers Cancer Awareness night.

In 2017, after the game against Kaohsiung Truth, Wong scored his 1000th ABL career points.

After sitting out for the 2017–18 ABL season, he officially signed with the CLS Knights Indonesia for the upcoming 2018–19 ABL season. It is believed that he is the first Singaporean to play professional basketball outside of the republic.

ABL statistics 

|-
| align=left | 2009–10
| align=left | Singapore
| 16|| 0 || 10:20 || .302 || .351|| .429 || 0.9 || 0.6 || 0.25|| .0 || 3.2
|-
| align=left | 2010–11
| align=left | Singapore
| 15|| 0 || 5:30 || .261 || .143|| .429 || .3 || .3 || .0 || .0 || 1.1
|-
| align=left | 2012
| align=left | Singapore
| 21|| 3 || 25:54 || 0.361 || .291|| .827 || 1.8 || 2.0 || 1.1 || .0 || 9.1
|-
| align=left | 2013
| align=left | Singapore
| 14|| 1 || 22:24 || .278 || .361 || .818 || 2.3 || 1.1 || .9 || .1 || 11.4

International career 
Wei Long is also a member of the men's Singapore national basketball team. In the 2011 SEABA tournament, Wei Long averaged 17.0 points and 4.0 rebounds, and shot a team-high 45.8% from three-point range.

See also 
 FIBA Asia Championship
 Singapore national basketball team
 ASEAN Basketball League
 Singapore Slingers

References

External links 
 
 Player profile at Basketball.Asia-Basket.com

1988 births
Living people
Competitors at the 2013 Southeast Asian Games
Competitors at the 2015 Southeast Asian Games
Competitors at the 2017 Southeast Asian Games
Competitors at the 2019 Southeast Asian Games
Expatriate basketball people in Indonesia
Point guards
Singapore Slingers players
Singaporean men's basketball players
Singaporean sportspeople of Chinese descent
Southeast Asian Games bronze medalists for Singapore
Southeast Asian Games medalists in basketball